Salyevka (Salğıya) is a rural locality (a selo) and the administrative centre of Salyevsky Selsoviet, Duvansky District, Bashkortostan, Russia. The population was 871 as of 2010. There are 5 streets.

Geography 
Salyevka is located 55 km northwest of Mesyagutovo (the district's administrative centre) by road. Yaroslavka is the nearest rural locality.

References 

Rural localities in Duvansky District